Sobre las olas (English: Over the Waves) is a 1950 Mexican musical biographical film directed by Ismael Rodríguez and starring Pedro Infante, Beatriz Aguirre and Andrés Soler. It portrays the life of the composer Juventino Rosas.

Cast 
 Pedro Infante as Juventino Rosas
 Beatriz Aguirre as Lolita
 Andrés Soler as Don Marcial Morales
 Prudencia Grifell as Doña Calixta Gutiérrez de Alfaro
 Antonio R. Frausto as Porfirio Díaz
 Miguel Manzano as Juan de Dios
 Beatriz Jimeno as Doña Carmelita Romero Rubio de Díaz
 Bertha Lomelí as Ángela Peralta
 Alicia Neira as Dolores
 José Luis Jiménez as Pepe Reyna
 Armando Acosta as Espectador teatro
 Norma Ancira
 Daniel Arroyo as Invitado en reunión
 Guillermo Bravo Sosa as Invitado a reunión
 Emilio Brillas as Anunciador en fiesta de palacio
 Jorge Chesterking as Invitado en reunión
 José Chávez as Invitado fiesta de palacio con turbante
 Roberto Corell as Mayer, prestamista
 Julio Daneri as Embajador de Turquia
 Manuel de la Vega as Invitado en reunión
 Irma Dorantes as Invitada a baile de palacio
 Pedro Elviro as Levy, prestamista
 Edmundo Espino
 Magdalena Estrada as Pajarera
 Mario García 'Harapos' as Invitado a baile
 Carmen Guillén as Invitada en fiesta de palacio
 Leonor Gómez as  de partera
 Elodia Hernández as Invitada en fiesta de palacio
 Carmen Manzano as Vendedora de flores
 Blanca Marroquín as Macaria, sirvienta
 Paco Martínez as Invitado en fiesta de palacio
 Pepe Martínez as Invitado en reunión
 Héctor Mateos
 Esteban Márquez as Roberto
 José Pardavé as Espectador concierto
 Salvador Quiroz as Teniente
 Emma Rodríguez as Invitada a concierto
 Humberto Rodríguez as Empleado de palacio
 Félix Samper as Espectador teatro
 María Luisa Smith as Madre de Juventino
 Manuel Sánchez Navarro as Mensajero de presidente
 Dolores Tinoco as Partera
 Alfonso Torres as Anunciador fecha conmemorativa
 Pastor Torres
 Manuel Trejo Morales as Capitán de barco
 María Valdealde as Invitada a baile de palacio

References

Bibliography 
 Heredia, Juanita. Transnational Latina Narratives in the Twenty-first Century. Palgrave Macmillan, 2009.

External links 
 

1950 films
1950 musical films
1950s biographical films
Mexican musical films
Mexican biographical films
1950s Spanish-language films
Films directed by Ismael Rodríguez
Films set in the 19th century
Films about composers
Biographical films about musicians
Cultural depictions of Porfirio Díaz
Cultural depictions of classical musicians
1950s Mexican films